Delle station is a railway station in the commune of Delle, in the French department of Territoire de Belfort, in the Bourgogne-Franche-Comté region.

The station originally opened in 1868, but service was interrupted between 1992–2006, and not fully resumed until 2018. The station opened on 29 June 1868; cross-border service to Switzerland began on 23 September 1872. Passenger service between Belfort and Delle ceased on 26 September 1992, and the station closed in 1995. A joint Franco-Swiss effort to re-open the line led to the resumption of cross-border service in 2006; service to Belfort resumed in 2018.

Services
The following services stop at Delle:

 RegioExpress: hourly service to Biel/Bienne and less than hourly service to Meroux.

References

External links 
 
 
 

Railway stations in France opened in 1868
Railway stations in Territoire de Belfort